Gura Camencii is a commune in Floreşti District, Moldova. It is composed of three villages: Bobulești, Gura Camencii and Gvozdova.

References

Communes of Florești District